Paul Bristow (born 27 March 1979) is a British politician who has served as the Member of Parliament (MP) for Peterborough since the 2019 general election. A member of the Conservative Party, he worked as a public relations consultant and was the chairman of the lobbying trade body, the Association of Professional Political Consultants, prior to his parliamentary career. Bristow was also a councillor on Hammersmith and Fulham London Borough Council between 2006 and 2010. Bristow controversially gave an interview to the BBC where he admits breaking lockdown to visit his father who was terminally ill.

Early life
Bristow was born in 1979 in York, North Yorkshire. His parents were both nurses. His father Alan was also a Conservative Party district councillor. Bristow grew up in Whittlesey in Cambridgeshire, where he had moved when he was five years old and attended Sir Harry Smith Community College. Bristow credits his school history teacher for fostering his interest in politics, and reports joining the Conservative Party at the age of 16. He studied History and Politics at Lancaster University (Cartmel College) and previously worked as a parliamentary aide for former Conservative MP Richard Spring.

Political career
In 2006, Bristow was elected to Hammersmith and Fulham Council as a councillor for Fulham Reach ward. He stood down from the council to contest the Labour-held seat of Middlesbrough South and East Cleveland at the 2010 general election, finishing in second place with 35.6% of the vote.

After returning to Peterborough, Bristow contested the 2019 Peterborough by-election, finishing in third place behind Labour's Lisa Forbes and Brexit Party candidate Mike Greene. At the 2019 general election, he won the seat with a majority of a majority of 2,580 votes. Before his parliamentary career, Bristow had been the chairman of the lobbying trade body, the Association of Professional Political Consultants, between 2017 and 2019. He was also the director of the healthcare public relations consultancy PB Consulting which he had founded in 2010. He resigned his directorship in January 2020. 

Following his election to Parliament, Bristow became a member of the Health and Social Care Committee, serving from 2020 to 2022. He was appointed as a Parliamentary Private Secretary to the Secretary of State for Digital, Culture, Media and Sport Nadine Dorries in February 2022.

In April 2021, The Observer reported that Bristow claimed rental expenses of £10,500 between April and November 2020 for his constituency accommodation while renting out three residential properties in London. Responding to the article, he stated that he had "followed both the letter and the spirit of the rules".

In November 2021, Bristow wrote an article in The Times calling for MPs to be banned from involvement in consultant lobbying. He initially supported Grant Shapps in the July 2022 Conservative Party leadership election, after Shapps withdrew, Bristow endorsed Liz Truss.

In October 2022, following the resignation of Truss as Prime Minister, Bristow announced that he would be supporting previous Prime Minister Boris Johnson in the subsequent leadership election.

Personal life
Bristow is a supporter of York City F.C. He is married and has two daughters. His wife Sara (née Petela) is a public relations consultant and has been the managing director of Healthcomms Consulting since January 2020 and Politicomms Consulting since November 2020. Healthcomms Consulting specialises in healthcare and health technology and was founded by Bristow in 2010 under its previous name, PB Consulting. He resigned his directorship in January 2020, handing control to his wife. His sister-in-law Emma is a director of the public relations consultancy, GK Strategy.

In August 2021, Bristow was given a 28-day driving ban after speeding on the A1. He requested the ban to avoid "any suggestion of hypocrisy" when campaigning about "speeding on residential streets" in Peterborough.

References

External links

1979 births
Living people
Politicians from York
UK MPs 2019–present
Conservative Party (UK) MPs for English constituencies
Councillors in the London Borough of Hammersmith and Fulham
Alumni of Lancaster University
Alumni of Cartmel College, Lancaster